Marc Mézard (born 29 August 1957) is a French physicist and academic administrator. He was, from 2012 to 2022, the director of the École normale supérieure (ENS). He is the co-author of two books.

Early life
Marc Mézard was born on 29 August 1957. He graduated from the École normale supérieure in 1976 and earned the agrégation in Physics. He earned a PhD in Physics from University of Paris 6 in 1980.

Career
Mézard joined the Centre national de la recherche scientifique (CNRS) as a researcher in 1981. He was a professor of Physics at the École Polytechnique. In 2001, he joined the Center for Theoretical Physics and Statistical Models at the University of Paris-Sud, and he serves as its director. Since 2012 to 2022, he had also served as the director of his alma mater, the ENS. In 2022 he joined the Department of the Computing Sciences at the Bocconi University in Milan.

Mézard is the author of 170 academic articles and the co-author of two books. He won the Prize Ampère in 1996, the Humboldt Prize in 2009, and the Lars Onsager Prize in 2016.

Works

References

External links
Faculty webpage

1957 births
Living people
Lycée Louis-le-Grand alumni
École Normale Supérieure alumni
Academic staff of the École Normale Supérieure
Academic staff of École Polytechnique
Academic staff of Paris-Sud University
French academic administrators
People from Aurillac
French physicists